Piodes coriacea is a species of long-horn beetle in the family Cerambycidae, the only species in the genus Piodes. This beetle is distributed in United States.

References

Lepturinae